The Raudhatain oil field is an oil field in Northern Kuwait. It contains 6 billion barrels of oil. It is being heavily developed.

See also

List of oil fields

Geography of Kuwait
Oil fields of Kuwait
Archaeological sites in Kuwait